Norco is a city in Riverside County, California, in the United States. Norco is known as Horsetown, USA and prides itself on being a "horse community," with horse trails, hitching posts, and corrals, and city ordinances requiring construction to have a "traditional, rustic... Western flavor".

As of the 2020 census, the city population was 26,316, down from 27,063 at the 2010 census.

History
The city's name is a portmanteau of "North Corona", named after the North Corona Land Company.

Norco had its "grand opening" on Mother's Day, May 13, 1923, and was later incorporated as a city on December 28, 1964.

Geography

One of the most notable geographical features in Norco, visible from anywhere in the city, are the Santa Ana Mountains.

Vegetation
Norco is rich in native plant species partly because of its diversity of habitats. The most prevalent plant communities are sage scrub, chaparral shrubland, and riparian woodland. Native plants include the California poppy, matilija poppy, toyon, Ceanothus, Chamise, Coast Live Oak, sycamore, willow and Giant Wildrye. (Erythrina caffra) (Strelitzia reginae). Mexican Fan Palms, Canary Island Palms, Queen Palms, Date Palms, and California Fan Palms are common in the Norco area, although only the latter is native. 
The Biome is the Mediterranean Biome but has many alternate names: The Woodland Biome, The Shrub Biome, or the Chaparral Biome.

Climate
Norco experiences a warm Mediterranean climate (Köppen climate classification: CSa) and has mild to cool winters and hot summers. Most of the rainfall occurs during winter and early spring.

The spring provides pleasant weather with little rain. In early summer, Norco receives overcast weather known as "May Gray" or "June Gloom". Summer is generally hot, with highs averaging above . During the hottest months, daytime temperatures can exceed . Thunderstorms are rare but not unheard of in late summer. Fall brings sunny and slightly cooler weather with little rain, but can be windy due to the Santa Ana winds that blow October and November. The winter low temperatures can get cold enough for frost, which is not uncommon in December and January.

Demographics

2010
At the 2010 census Norco had a population of 27,063. The racial makeup of Norco was 20,641 (76.3%) White (56.4% Non-Hispanic White), 1,893 (7.0%) African American, 248 (0.9%) Native American, 844 (3.1%) Asian, 59 (0.2%) Pacific Islander, 2,514 (9.3%) from other races, and 864 (3.2%) from two or more races. Hispanic or Latino of any race were 8,405 persons (31.1%).

The census reported that 22,666 people (83.8% of the population) lived in households, 75 (0.3%) lived in non-institutionalized group quarters, and 4,322 (16.0%) were institutionalized.

There were 7,023 households, 2,831 (40.3%) had children under the age of 18 living in them, 4,353 (62.0%) were opposite-sex married couples living together, 777 (11.1%) had a female householder with no husband present, 453 (6.5%) had a male householder with no wife present. There were 354 (5.0%) unmarried opposite-sex partnerships, and 61 (0.9%) same-sex married couples or partnerships. 1,030 households (14.7%) were one person and 458 (6.5%) had someone living alone who was 65 or older. The average household size was 3.23.  There were 5,583 families (79.5% of households); the average family size was 3.53.

The age distribution was 5,488 people (20.3%) under the age of 18, 2,798 people (10.3%) aged 18 to 24, 7,854 people (29.0%) aged 25 to 44, 8,303 people (30.7%) aged 45 to 64, and 2,620 people (9.7%) who were 65 or older. The median age was 39.5 years. For every 100 females, there were 136.8 males.  For every 100 females age 18 and over, there were 146.7 males.

There were 7,322 housing units at an average density of 512.8 per square mile, of the occupied units 5,702 (81.2%) were owner-occupied and 1,321 (18.8%) were rented. The homeowner vacancy rate was 1.9%; the rental vacancy rate was 3.8%. 18,572 people (68.6% of the population) lived in owner-occupied housing units and 4,094 people (15.1%) lived in rental housing units.

According to the 2010 United States Census, Norco had a median household income of $82,074, with 9.9% of the population living below the federal poverty line.

2000
At the 2000 census there were 24,157 people in 6,136 households, including 4,945 families, in the city. The racial makeup of the city was 82.4% White, 6.1% African American, 0.8% Native American, 1.2% Asian, 0.1% Pacific Islander, 6.4% from other races, and 3.0% from two or more races. Hispanic or Latino of any race were 22.8%.

Of the 6,136 households 37.7% had children under the age of 18 living with them, 64.7% were married couples living together, 10.4% had a female householder with no husband present, and 19.4% were non-families. 13.7% of households were one person and 4.5% were one person aged 65 or older. The average household size was 3.2 and the average family size was 3.4.

The age distribution was 22.4% under the age of 18, 8.8% from 18 to 24, 37.7% from 25 to 44, 24.5% from 45 to 64, and 6.6% 65 or older. The median age was 36 years. For every 100 females, there were 128.4 males. For every 100 females age 18 and over, there were 137.6 males.

The median income for a household in the city was $62,652, and the median family income was $66,204. Males had a median income of $41,599 versus $30,652 for females. The per capita income for the city was $20,710. About 3.3% of families and 5.3% of the population were below the poverty line, including 3.9% of those under age 18 and 2.2% of those age 65 or over.

Economy

Major employers
According to the city's 2022 Comprehensive Annual Financial Report, the top employers in the city are:

Culture 
As a horse community, there are few sidewalks in the city of Norco; instead there are horse trails, and riders can ride to town and tie their horses at the many hitching rails and corrals placed close to businesses. Many horse-related associations are a part of the city, including the Norco Horsemen's Association and the Norco Junior Horsemen's Association.

Politics in Norco are also dominated by concerns about horses and animal-keeping versus suburbanization, a battle that has played out over development in the Norco Hills. In that area, which borders eastern Corona and Riverside, an influx of Orange County commuters are buying homes for $500,000 and up that have few provisions for animal-keeping. The original spirit of the town's incorporation was to promote "City living in a rural atmosphere".  According to city ordinances, the architecture of Norco "shall reflect a desired Western theme," including qualities "described as rural, informal, traditional, rustic, low-profile and equestrian oriented".

In 2006, Norco began promoting itself as "Horsetown U.S.A." and received a federal trademark.

Norco is the home of the Norco Animal Rescue Team. NART was founded after the October 2003 wildfires that savaged San Bernardino County and San Diego County. During the fires, Norco citizens banded together to provide a place of refuge for horses and other animals being evacuated from the fire areas. In the aftermath of these fires, the community of Norco recognized a need for an organized group to assist in the evacuation of mainly large animals from floods, fires and other dangers. NART has mobilized during every major fire to hit Southern California since 2004.

The largest event highlighting Norco's community and lifestyle is the annual Norco Fair, run by community volunteers. The Norco Fair runs over Labor Day Weekend, beginning on Thursday evening with the Miss Norco, Horsetown USA Contest and continues until Monday, finishing with a Labor Day Parade down 6th Street. Events included at the Fair are the rodeo, rodeo dance, calf dressing competition, pageants, exhibitions, cowboy poker, wild cow milking, snail races, talent show, pet parade, and "Family Fun Day".

Norco's largest event center, the George Ingalls Equestrian Event Center, hosts events such as Norco Fair and the Norco rodeo. Named after George Alan Ingalls, a Medal of Honor recipient, the center has covered horse arenas and other amenities.

Government
In 2003, Norco became a charter city for the express purpose of protecting and preserving animal-keeping rights. The charter was not extensive; it maintained nearly all aspects of California's General Law provisions, diverging only in three areas: horse trails, lot size, and animal-keeping rights. To change any ordinances in Norco relating to those three topics requires a supermajority (four-fifths) vote of the City Council.

Representation
Federal:
Democrats Dianne Feinstein and Alex Padilla represent California in the United States Senate.

State:

Local:
In the Riverside County Board of Supervisors, Norco is in the Second District, represented by Karen Spiegel.

Voting history
Norco is staunchly Republican in presidential elections.

Infrastructure

Transportation
Interstate 15 bisects Norco, connecting the city to points south such as San Diego and to points north such as Ontario and Las Vegas.

The Riverside Transit Agency (RTA)'s Route 3 provides bus transit from Norco north to Eastvale and south to Corona at the Corona Transit Center, approximately one mile south of the city limits. Rail transportation to Los Angeles and Orange County is provided via the Corona-North Main station on Metrolink's 91/Perris Valley and Inland Empire-Orange County lines, also out of the Corona Transit Center.

Public safety
Norco contracts out for law enforcement services with the Riverside County Sheriff's Department through a regional station on Clark Avenue.

The city of Norco contracts for fire and paramedic services with the Riverside County Fire Department through a cooperative agreement with CAL FIRE.

In popular culture
In the Sons of Anarchy episode "Greensleeves", Nero buys his uncle's ranch in Norco as his retirement destination.

See also

 Norco High School
 Norco shootout

References

External links

 
 

 
1923 establishments in California
1964 establishments in California
Cities in Riverside County, California
Incorporated cities and towns in California
Populated places established in 1923
Populated places established in 1964
Populated places on the Santa Ana River